Josif is a masculine given name, a cognate of Joseph. It may refer to:

Josif Chirila (born 1983), Romanian sprint canoeist who has competed since 2004
Josif Dorfman (born 1952), Ukrainian-French chess Grandmaster, coach, and chess writer
Josif Marinković (1851–1931), Serbian composer of the nineteenth century
Josif Pančić (1814–1888), Serbian botanist
Josif Rajačić (1785–1861), metropolitan of Sremski Karlovci, Serbian patriarch, administrator of Serbian Vojvodina, baron
Josif Runjanin (1821–1878), Croatian composer of Serbian ethnicity, composed the melody of the Croatian national anthem
Josif Shtokalo (1897–1987), Ukrainian mathematician

See also
Joseph (disambiguation)
Josifović, Serbian surname

Serbian masculine given names